Peter Dendle is a professor of English at Penn State Mont Alto, teaching classes on folklore, 20th and 21st century representations of the Middle Ages, Old and Middle English (language and literature), and the monstrous (in film, folklore, and society). Dendle has written books and articles on a number of topics, including cryptozoology, philology, the demonic in literature, zombie movies, and Medieval plants and medicine.  His work on zombies was featured by NPR.

Career

His education includes a B.A. in English and Philosophy (1990) and an M.A. in Philosophy (1993), both from the University of Kentucky, as well as an M.A. in English from Yale (1991) and a PhD in English from the University of Toronto (1998).

In 2007, National Geographic featured some of the research results from Dendle's monograph Demon Possession in Anglo-Saxon England. Other recent works include peer-reviewed articles on cryptozoology, medieval charms, demon possession, gender in Old Norse and Anglo-Saxon literature, and a translation and analysis of The Old English Life of Malchus and Two Vernacular Tales from the Vitas Patrum in MS Cotton Otho C.i: which appeared in English Studies, 2010.

He is the co-editor of three collections of academic essays on various aspects of the preternatural: Health and Healing from the Medieval Garden (Boydell, 2008), The Ashgate Research Companion to Monsters and the Monstrous (Ashgate, 2012), and The Devil in Society in Premodern Europe (Centre for Reformation and Renaissance Studies, 2012) with Richard Raiswell (University of Prince Edward Island).

Dendle's The Zombie Movie Encyclopedia (McFarland, 2001) was the first exhaustive overview of the subject, evaluating over 200 movies from 16 countries over a 65-year period starting from the early 1930s. The follow-up volume, The Zombie Movie Encyclopedia, Volume 2: 2000–2010 (McFarland), was published in 2012.

Selected publications

Monographs

Edited Collections

 Richard Raiswell with Peter Dendle 
 Asa Simon Mittman and Peter Dendle, 
 Peter Dendle and Alain Touwaide (eds.).

References

External links 
 Peter Dendle at Penn State Mont Alto
 "Night of the Living Dendle," Allthingszombie.com interview

Living people
American folklorists
American medievalists
Critics of cryptozoology
21st-century American non-fiction writers
University of Kentucky alumni
Pennsylvania State University faculty
University of Toronto alumni
Yale Graduate School of Arts and Sciences alumni
Year of birth missing (living people)